The 2015–16 Wagner Seahawks men's basketball team represented Wagner College during the 2015–16 NCAA Division I men's basketball season. The Seahawks were led by fourth year head coach Bashir Mason. They played their home games at Spiro Sports Center on the College's Staten Island campus and were members of the Northeast Conference. They finished the season 23–11, 13–5 in NEC play to win the regular season championship. They defeated Robert Morris and LIU Brooklyn to advance to the championship game of the NEC tournament where they lost to Fairleigh Dickinson. As a regular season conference champion who failed to win their conference tournament, they received an automatic bid to the National Invitation Tournament where they defeated St. Bonaventure in the first round before losing in the second round to Creighton.

Roster
Official 2015–16 Wagner Roster

Schedule

|-
!colspan=9 style="background:#004236; color:#CCCCCC;"| Non-conference regular season

|-
!colspan=9 style="background:#004236; color:#CCCCCC;"| NEC regular season

|-
!colspan=9 style="background:#004236; color:#CCCCCC;"| Northeast Conference tournament

|-
!colspan=9 style="background:#004236; color:#CCCCCC;"| NIT

References 

Wagner Seahawks men's basketball seasons
Wagner
Wagner
Wagner
Wagner